Choices of the Heart: The Margaret Sanger Story (1995) is an American television film about the controversial nurse Margaret Sanger who campaigned in the earlier decades of the 20th century in the United States for women's birth control.

Plot
The New York Times wrote this summary overview: "Dana Delany stars in this made-for-TV movie as Margaret Sanger, a nurse who, in 1914, became a pioneering crusader for women's birth control (she opposed abortion) after she published a booklet on birth control techniques that flew in the face of a law established by Anthony Comstock (Rod Steiger) forbidding the dissemination of information on contraception. Sanger later helped to establish America's first birth control clinic in 1916, and in 1925 was one of the founders of Planned Parenthood."

Critical commentary
The New York Times television critic John J. O'Connor wrote the movie describes an "extraordinary woman whose contraception crusade eventually led to the founding of Planned Parenthood," adding that the movie "camouflages its sketchiness with some fine performances."

Cast

Dana Delany as Margaret Sanger
Henry Czerny as Bill Sanger
Rod Steiger as Anthony Comstock
Julie Khaner as Anita Block
Tom McCamus as Mr. Schlesinger
Wayne Robson as Ed Cady
Yank Azman as Arnold Scopes
Jeff Pustil as Heller
Kenneth Welsh as Mr. Higgins
Jason Priestley as Narrator
Ron Hartman as Dr. Benjamin
Catherine Barroll as Nan Higgins
Nicu Branzea as Leo Krulic
Patrick Galligan as D.A. Whitman
Sandra Crljenica as Peggy Sanger
Blake McGrath as Stuart Sanger
Lachlan Murdoch as Grant Sanger
Heidi von Paleske as Mabel Dodge
Henriette Ivanans as Sadie Sachs
Dan Lett as Reporter #2
Maria Vacratsis as Emma Goldman
Les Porter as Reporter #3
Martin Julien as Jake Sachs
John Gilbert as Utermeyer
James B. Douglas as Judge McInery
Addison Bell as Bailiff
Peter Spence as Driver at Port
Elva Mai Hoover as N.Y. Librarian
Tony Munch as Bohemian #1
Michael Dyson as Bohemian #2

References

External links

1995 television films
1995 films
1990s biographical drama films
American biographical drama films
Films about activists
1995 drama films
American drama television films
1990s American films